The Ajabakan were an indigenous Australian  people of the Cape York Peninsula of Queensland.

Country
The Ajabakan's lands extended over  around the Upper Edward River. Ursula McConnel in the late twenties identified members of the Ajabakan, together with the Wikianji living westwards of the Aiyaboto who were living south of Coen.

Language
The Ajabakan spoke Bakanha/Ayabakan(u), classified by Robert M. W. Dixon as one of the languages of the Wik subgroup of the Northern Cape York Peninsula A list of words has been compiled by Philip Hamilton as part of a comparative Uw Oykangand and Uw Olkola online dictionary project.

Social organization
Ajabakan culture was sufficiently similar to that of the Munkan to lead McConnel to suspect that they had only detached themselves from the latter in recent times in order to form a distinct tribal grouping, and one which then formed close associations with the Ayapathu.
Their social groups were divided into two moieties kuyen (u) and katpen (u), virtually interchangeable with those of the Wikianji. According to Lauriston Sharp, the Ajabakan ic system belonged to what he called the Group V Yir Yoront typology, with clans having a single totem, exclusively under its control in terms of choice of ceremonial site, and strong phratric groupings of clans, bound to the totems of their constituent clans. Clan descent was patrilineal, with; the spirit babies (bukwa nepi) usually located on the land belonging to the father's clan.
The Ajabakan, together with the southern Ayapathu and Koko olkolo, . would come from their respectives heartlands on the upper Edward, upper Holroyd, and Coleman Rivers to meet up with the Kaantju on ceremonial occasion on the Ebagoolah cattle-run.  These Kaantju had an important wedge role as a territorial mediator between Gulf watershed and east coast tribes.

Alternative names
 Aiabakan
 Bakanu
 Baganu.
 Pakanh
 Yirrq-mayn(Bakanh).

Notes

Citations

Sources

Aboriginal peoples of Queensland